Five to Eleven was a popular television programme on BBC 1 which ran between 1986 and 1990. Different celebrities of the day presented poems or short readings in a simple format. The programme was screened at 10:55am each weekday morning, which explains the title. Each episode was four minutes in length. The series was introduced in May 1986 (when BBC1 introduced daytime scheduling at the start of the year) due to an unforeseen gap in the schedule after the 11:45am news bulletin finished.

The most common presenter between 1986 and 1989 was Joss Ackland. Other celebrity hosts included Richard Briers, Philip Madoc, Amanda Redman, Annette Crosbie, Judi Dench, Patricia Routledge, Emma Thompson, Joanna Lumley and even Sir Laurence Olivier (in a Christmas special on 24 December 1987).

Essentially a variation on Jackanory, Five To Eleven was set in small studio which famously featured "dying" floral arrangements and a sea-green background. The opening titles and end "credits" (there were only three, shown in one take) featured a mid-tempo theme tune of panpipes and flutes.

In late 1989, the programme underwent some cosmetic changes, being given a new, more contemporary synthesised theme tune and a new set of titles/credits; the sea-green background and floral arrangements were dropped in favour of a scarlet set with a gold backcloth, and the celebrity presenters were dropped and replaced with children of school age. This new format proved less popular with regular audiences, and in 1990 Five To Eleven was cancelled due to falling viewing figures.

External links 
 British Film Institute page

1980s British television series
1990s British television series
1986 British television series debuts
1990 British television series endings
BBC Television shows
Storytelling television shows
English-language television shows